Emilio Leti (born 23 November 1963) is a Samoan boxer. He competed in the men's heavyweight event at the 1992 Summer Olympics. He later moved to New Zealand and won titles in New Zealand and Australia.

References

External links
 

1963 births
Living people
Samoan male boxers
Olympic boxers of Samoa
Boxers at the 1992 Summer Olympics
Commonwealth Games competitors for Samoa
Boxers at the 1994 Commonwealth Games
Place of birth missing (living people)
Heavyweight boxers